Apatosuchus is an extinct genus of non-crocodylomorph loricatan pseudosuchian known from the Late Triassic of Germany. It is known from a partial holotype skull from the middle Stubensandstein (a deposit that dates back to the Norian stage and is part of the Löwenstein Formation) in Baden-Württemberg. The type species is Halticosaurus orbitoangulatus. A. orbitoangulatus was first described by German paleontologist Friedrich von Huene in 1932, who considered it a species of the theropod dinosaur Halticosaurus. Some later studies proposed that it was an early crocodylomorph or "sphenosuchian" like Saltoposuchus, another pseudosuchian from the middle Stubensandstein of Baden-Württemberg. The name Apatosuchus, "deceptive crocodile", was erected for H. orbitoangulatus by Hans-Dieter Sues and Rainer R. Schoch in 2013 when it was realized that the known material represented a pseudosuchian archosaur rather than a dinosaur, as a result of further preparation of the specimen, coining the combinatio nova Apatosuchus orbitoangulatus. Apatosuchus is now thought to be a basal member of the clade Loricata. Apatosuchus is much smaller in size than other basal loricatans such as Teratosaurus  and Batrachotomus.

Phylogeny
A phylogenetic analysis performed by Sues & Schoch (2013) found Apatosuchus to be the sister taxon of the clade formed by Batrachotomus and more derived loricatans. This position was supported by two unambiguous synapomorphies: the presence of a ridge on the dorsal surface of squamosal along the edge of supratemporal fossa, and concaved rear portion of the nasals at the midline. The data matrix of Sues & Schoch (2013), a list of characteristics that was used in the analysis, was based on that of Nesbitt (2011), one of the most extensive on archosaurs. Below is a cladogram from the analysis.

References 

Late Triassic reptiles of Europe
Norian life
Triassic Germany
Fossils of Germany
Fossil taxa described in 2013
Prehistoric pseudosuchian genera